Autumn' 66 is the third studio album by the British rock group The Spencer Davis Group released in 1966. Although the album was not released in the US, the single "Somebody Help Me" was on the US Billboard Hot 100 charts for seven weeks and peaked at number 47 in July, 1967.

Although never released in America, all but four tracks ("When A Man Loves A Woman", "Dust My Blues", "On the Green Light", and "Neighbour Neighbour") were released either as album tracks or as B-sides.

Reception

The AllMusic retrospective review by Richie Unterberger commented that "At the peak of their popularity, the Spencer Davis Group's albums were considerably less impressive than their hits", and criticized the album for relying too heavily on covers. However, they named the original songs "Somebody Help Me," "High Time Baby," "On the Green Light," and "When I Come Home" as highlights.

Track listing

Side One 
 "Together 'Til the End of Time" (Frank Wilson) – 2:15)
 "Take This Hurt Off Me" (Don Covay, Ron Dean Miller) – 2:44)
 "Nobody Knows You When You're Down and Out" (Jimmy Cox) – 3:52)
 "Midnight Special" (Traditional, arranged by Spencer Davis) – 2:13)
 "When a Man Loves a Woman" (Andrew Wright, Calvin Lewis) – 3:08)
 "When I Come Home" (Jackie Edwards, Steve Winwood) – 2:04

Side Two 
 "Mean Woman Blues" (Claude Demetrius) – 3:14
 "Dust My Blues" (Elmore James) – 2:36
 "On the Green Light" (S. Winwood) – 3:05
 "Neighbour, Neighbour" (A.J. Valier) – 3:17
 "High Time Baby" (S. Winwood, Davis, Muff Winwood, Pete York) – 2:31
 "Somebody Help Me" (Edwards) – 2:00

Personnel

The Spencer Davis Group
 Steve Winwood – lead guitar, organ, lead vocals (except where noted)
 Muff Winwood – bass                                                                                                                                                                                                                                                                                                                                                                   
 Spencer Davis – rhythm guitar, vocals (lead vocal on "Midnight Special" , "Dust My Blues" & "Neighbour, Neighbour")
 Pete York – drums

Technical
 Chris Blackwell – producer
 Bob Auger – engineer
 Vic Singh – photography
 Peter York – liner notes

References 

1966 albums
The Spencer Davis Group albums
Albums produced by Chris Blackwell
Fontana Records albums